Joseph Merkle (16 August 1882 – 3 February 1952) was a German wrestler. He competed in the middleweight event at the 1912 Summer Olympics.

References

External links
 

1882 births
1952 deaths
Olympic wrestlers of Germany
Wrestlers at the 1912 Summer Olympics
German male sport wrestlers
Sportspeople from Fürth